Baba Fighani Shirazi (also spelled Faghani; died 1519) was a Persian poet active in the late 15th and early 16th centuries. Born and raised in the southern city of Shiraz, Fighani belonged to a family of craftsmen, working as a cutler for his father and brother during his youth. It is unknown how Fighani how rose to prominence as a poet, but by the time the Aq Qoyunlu Ya'qub Beg ruled, he had become a notable figure, and was thus was given the honorific title of bābā shāʿir or bābā al-shuʿarā (lit. "papa poet") by the latter. 

Fighani served as a court poet of Ya'qub Beg alongside other distinguished figures such as Ahli Shirazi, Kamal al-Din Bana'i Haravi, and Shahidi Qumi. Fighani also established a reputation as someone who could not drink much alcohol without getting quickly drunk, despite his fondness and frequent visits to local taverns. During the disintegration of the Aq Qoyunlu realm, Fighani left for the east, where he settled in Abivard, and then finally Mashhad. There he dedicated many of his poems to the Shi'i Imams and the rising Safavid ruler, Shah Ismail I. Fighani died in 1519 in Mashhad, where he was buried.

By the early 17th-century, Fighani became regarded as the founder of the "Fresh Style" (ṭarz-i tāza) of Persian poetry, later known as sabk-i Hindī (lit. "Indian style"), which was the leading style for over two centuries. However, Iranologist Homa Katouzian considers attribution to be an "exaggeration", stating that the movement was an "evolutionary one." Fighani's work had a permanent impact on the design of Persian poetry under the Safavids.

References

Sources 
 
 
 
 

15th-century Iranian writers
16th-century writers of Safavid Iran
Poets of the Aq Qoyunlu
People from Shiraz
1519 deaths
16th-century Iranian writers